The Argentine Army Aviation (AvEj) is the army aviation branch of the Argentine Army. Their members have the same rank insignia and titles as the rest of the Army. The Army Aviation Command is based at Campo de Mayo Military Airfield.

Along with its primary role of supporting Army operations, the Army Aviation is highly involved in humanitarian aid missions, emergency relief, medical evacuations and forest firefighting.

History

Military aviation in Argentina traces back to the Paraguayan War when, on 8 July 1867, Staff Sergeant Roberto A. Chodasiewicz used an observation balloon during the battle of Humaitá. Since then, the army was the main driving force behind national aeronautical development. The use of enthusiastic students who relied on the selfless support of civil institutions and air clubs, saw the creation of the Military Aviation School at El Palomar in 1912.

The establishment of the Army Aviation Service (in Spanish, Servicio de Aviación del Ejército) saw a great expansion of Argentine air power in the 1912–1945 period, and supported the development of civil aviation in Argentina. The creation of the first aviation units and the foundation of the Fábrica Militar de Aviones in the 1920s were the beginning of a process that lead to the creation of the Argentine Air Force in 1945, to which the Army transferred its aircraft and related installations.

Re-establishment 

In 1956, Army Aviation was re-established within the Army and began a major expansion, incorporating new types of aircraft and opening new bases around the country. In 1965, using a Cessna U-17 they performed their first expedition to the South Pole.

During the 1970s the service consolidated itself as an important branch of the Army receiving aircraft such as the Aeritalia G.222 transport which caused friction with the Air Force. The expansion plans continued in the early 1980s with the incorporation of the Agusta A109 utility and the Boeing CH-47 Chinook heavy-lift helicopters.

The dictatorship that took power in 1976 increased tensions with Chile which reached their highest point during the 1978 Operation Soberanía where the Army Aviation performed major deployments.

Falklands War

In 1982, the Military Junta invaded the Falkland Islands triggering a ten-week-long war against the United Kingdom. The Argentine Army Aviation deployed 2 CH-47 Chinooks, 3 Agusta A109, 6 SA330 Pumas and 9 UH-1Hs to the islands, where they performed 796 general support flights under harsh operating conditions. Their helicopters were also extensively used in Patagonia and the Army also took over the provincial police's MBB Bo 105s during the conflict.

Six Army aviation members died in the war. Two army helicopters were shot down, six destroyed on the ground, and ten were captured. Some of these captured were used by British Army and other used as targets for RAF ground attack training.

Present Day

After the war, the Aerospatiale Super Puma was incorporated, mainly for Antarctica support duties operating from Navy's icebreaker ARA Almirante Irizar. In 1998, Argentina was granted Major Non-NATO ally status by United States President Bill Clinton and the Army Aviation began an expansive program that included the reception of OV-1 Mohawks and surplus UH-1H from the US Army. The US also authorized the delivery of 12 AH-1F Cobra gunships but the operation was halted by the Argentine Government.

In the 1990s, the Aviation Army began its Unmanned aerial vehicle program, the Lipan series.picture In 2007, the Ministry of Defense evaluated the Chinese Changhe Z-11 (Argentine index AE-350) and 40 are to be built. Also in 2007, the Army unveiled the indigenous Cicaré CH-14 Aguilucho scout prototype video. A major update program is currently underway refitting the Hueys to the Huey II variant. In March 2010 it was announced the purchase of five Bell 206 for the Joint armed forces school.

Army aircraft with tactical camouflage have adopted high-visibility yellow markings Ejército (Spanish for “Army”) in order to encourage the national press to stop referring to them as belonging to the air force.

In the 2014 celebration of the Argentine Army Aviation day, the following actions to improve capabilities were confirmed:
 purchase of 1 Cessna Citation and 4 Grand Caravan aircraft
 purchase of 2 CASA C-212 aircraft
 replacement of Mohawk by Diamond 42 aircraft
 purchase of second hand Italian AB206 helicopters (agreement reached but never signed until new government took power in 2016)
 upgrade of remaining UH-1 helicopters to Huey II standard (due to budget restrictions purchase of new helicopters was abandoned).
 refurbishing of Super Puma helicopters.

Currently, Argentina has expressed interest in buying surplus US equipment and authorization granted by US government. This may involve transport or scout helicopters.

The Army Aviation Command was renamed as “Army Aviation Directorate” (Dirección de Aviación de Ejército). Eight years later recovered its previous name, while going to depend of the Army Enlistment and Training Command.

Organisation

Organizational structure 

The main airbase is located at Campo de Mayo where training and maintenance is done. The units based there are as follows:
 Army Aviation Group 601
 601st Assault Helicopter Battalion
 601st Aviation Supply and Maintenance Battalion
 601st Intelligence Support Aviation Squadron
 601st Combat Support Aviation Battalion
 602nd Attack/Scout Aviation Squadron
 603rd General Support Aviation Squadron
 604th Support Aviation Squadron

The service has also permanent forward location bases assigned to both division and brigade HQ levels.
 1st Army Division
 121st Army Aviation Section (Rosario)
 2nd Army Aviation Section (Paraná)
 12th Army Aviation Section (Posadas)
 2nd Army Division
 141st Army Aviation Section (Córdoba)
 6th Army Aviation Section (Neuquén)
 8th Army Aviation Section (Mendoza)
 3rd Army Division
 181st Army Aviation Section (Bahía Blanca)
 9th Army Aviation Section (Comodoro Rivadavia)
 11th Army Aviation Section (Río Gallegos)

Pilot recruitment and training 

The Argentine Army gets its pilots from two main sources. One is the officers who graduate from the Military College and then volunteer for the Army Aviator Course. This course lasts one year and takes place at either the Air Force Academy, in Córdoba (for fixed wing aircraft), or the Army Aviation School (for helicopters), in Campo de Mayo, outside Buenos Aires. Since 2009, these two schools are the only training centers for pilots from the three armed services. The other source is civilian pilots who, after a ten-month course at the Military Academy, join the Army Aviation as 2nd lieutenants.

While College-graduated officers are called “Army Aviators” and those coming from civilian life are “Army Pilots”, there are no specific technical differences between them. However, “Army Pilots” can only reach the rank of colonel. Also, “Army Aviators” retain their original branch (i.e. Infantry, Cavalry, Artillery, Engineers, Signals or Ordnance) and can be posted to their branch's units in case of need. “Army Pilots”, instead, can only serve in Army Aviation units or related positions, as they have no other capability.

Aircraft inventory

The Argentine Army Aviation current inventory includes the following aircraft.

See also 

 Argentine air forces in the Falklands War
 Argentine Air Force
 Argentine Naval Aviation
 Equipment of the Argentine Army

References

Citations

Sources 
 Portions based on a translation from Spanish Wikipedia.
 Aviación de Ejército official site

Further reading

External links 

 Argentine Army Aviation official site
 Argentine Army official site
  Los AVRO 504 en Argentina y el método Gosport
  El rol de la Aviación de Ejército en el desarrollo de la aviación civil (Período 1919-1927)
  - Ejército, Introducción - Aeromilitaria website (2007) (accessed 2015-05-09)
 Argentina Army Aviation - Aeroflight website (2009) (accessed 2015-05-09)

Argentina Army Aviation
Army Aviation
Army units and formations of Argentina
Aviation in Argentina
San Miguel Partido

es:Anexo:Unidades del Ejército Argentino#Unidades de la Especialidad de Aviación del Ejército